Placosaris leucula is a moth in the family Crambidae. It was described by Edward Meyrick in 1897. It is found in the Sangihe Islands of Indonesia and the island of Luzon in the Philippines.

References

Moths described in 1897
Pyraustinae